"Love no Theme" is Ai Otsuka's first (15th overall) single under the avex trax label under her pen name Love. It is also her second single released in 2007.

"Love no Theme", marks the first time that Ai has released a single about a character bunny name Love-chan and under her pen name Love. "I canChu♥" was the original title but it was changed to "Love no Theme".

"Love no Theme" also the opening theme for the Oshare Majo: Love and Berry anime movie, Oshare Majo: Love and Berry Shiwase no Mahou.

Track listing

CD

 Love no Teema (instrumental)
 Next Single Preview (White Choco)

DVD
 Love no Theme (PV)

Charts
Oricon Sales Chart (Japan)

External links
Ai Otsuka's LOVE official website

Ai Otsuka songs
2007 singles
2007 songs
Avex Trax singles
Japanese film songs
Songs written for animated films